Riali Khurd & Kalan is a village situated in the mandal (or tehsil)  Pathankot, in the Gurdaspur district, Punjab, India near Batala. There are almost 9 Gurudwara Sahib Ji in the village. There are Two higher education institutions in this village, Guru Ram Das Academy, Riali Kalan and Government Senior Secondary School. Village Has Also Two Proud Martyr: Kargil Martyr Sardar Jagdeep Singh And Martyr Sardar Gurmeet Singh. Notable people from this village include Joga Singh

References

Villages in Gurdaspur district